Hotel ICON is a boutique hotel located in downtown Houston, Texas, USA. The hotel is part of Marriott International's Autograph Collection Hotels. Located in the former Union National Bank building that was constructed in 1911, the hotel was designed by San Francisco design firm Candra Scott & Anderson at the cost of $35 million. The 12-story hotel features 135 guest rooms and nine individually designed signature suites that include custom-designed period furnishings and décor with original artwork.

Transportation 
The hotel offers a private car within downtown and a PediaCab within a short distance.  Taxi service is available. The hotel is adjacent to METRORail's Preston Station which provides light rail service to the Houston Museum District, the Texas Medical Center, Rice University, Hermann Park, the Texas Medical Center, NRG Center and NRG Stadium. The hotel is within driving distance to the Uptown area.

See also
Yule marble

References

External links
 Hotel ICON website
 Hotel ICON profile on Autograph Collection website
 Feature on Hotel ICON at Travel America Guides

Hotels in Houston
Buildings and structures in Houston
Autograph Collection Hotels